Shan United Football Club is a professional Burmese football club based in Taunggyi, Myanmar, representing Shan State in the Myanmar National League. It had previously competed as an amateur club under the name Kanbawza FC, based in Yangon.

History

Kanbawza Football Club, founded in 2003, played as an amateur club in the Myanmar Premier League, the highest football league in Myanmar at the time.  The club's first manager was Myo Win Nyunt; its first coach was Ye Nyunt. The club won the league championship in 2007 and participated in the AFC President's Cup 2008 tournament. Kanbawza FC was a founding member of the Myanmar National League, which succeeded the Myanmar Premier League in 2009. In the process, the club changed its status from amateur to professional, and changed its home base from Yangon to Taunggyi.

The first professional manager was Aye Maung Gyi, who also served as head coach. The former captain of the Myanmar national team, Soe Myat Min, became Kanbawza's first captain, and the most expensive player in the Myanmar National League. The club has also signed other Myanmar international football team players.

In its first-ever professional football match, Kanbawza won by 3 goals over Okktha United FC. Sa Htet Naing scored the team's first goal and defender Khin Maung Lwin won the Man of the Match award, scoring the team's other two goals. Kanbawza FC finished fourth in the league's inaugural cup competition, the Myanmar National League Cup 2009. In February 2010, former finance and revenue team manager Khin Maung Kyaing took control the club as chief executive officer. In 2012, it finished as League runners-up. In 2015, Kanbawza F.C. changed its name to Shan United FC.

Players

2023 Final Squad

Continental record

Invitational tournament record

Achievements

Myanmar National League
 Winners: 2017, 2019, 2020, 2022
Myanmar Premier League
 Winners: 2007, 2008
General Aung San Shield
 Winners: 2017
MFF Charity Cup
 Winner: 2019, 2020

Domestic

Main sponsor
KBZ Pay

Co-Sponsors
Pro Sport
100 Plus

References

External links
 Kanbawza FC in Burmese
 First Eleven Journal in Burmese
 Soccer Myanmar in Burmese

Association football clubs established in 2005
Myanmar National League clubs
Myanmar Premier League clubs
2005 establishments in Myanmar
Football clubs in Myanmar